Frederick Thomas Fisher (12 January 1920 – 1993) was an English professional footballer who played as a full-back.

References

1920 births
1993 deaths
Sportspeople from Wednesbury
English footballers
Association football fullbacks
Fallings Heath F.C. players
Grimsby Town F.C. players
Rochdale A.F.C. players
Boston United F.C. players
Spalding United F.C. players
Wisbech Town F.C. players
Barton Town F.C. (1880) players
Alford United F.C. players
English Football League players